Filipino boy band SB19 debuted on the music scene in October of 2018. They have since released or featured in 14 music videos. Known for their vocal power and harmonization, synchronization much quality music videos—and high-level choreography therein—the band have achieved multiple awards and won various domestic and international awards for them. They have also appeared in commercials for brands such as Acer, Samsung, Pepsi, Dunkin' Donuts, and Pizza Hut, among others.

Music videos

2010s

2020s

Filmography

Film

Television

Webcast

Online shows

References 

Videography
Videographies of Filipino artists